Undressing Israel: Gay Men in the Promised Land is a 46-minute documentary written by American adult-film entrepreneur, columnist, gay activist and gay pornographic film director Michael Lucas, and co-directed by Lucas and Israeli director Yariv Mozer. In his debut as a documentary filmmaker, Michael Lucas portrays in this film released in 2012 Israel's thriving GLBT community through footage of Tel Aviv's vibrant nightlife, a same-sex wedding, and candid interviews with a diverse range of local Israeli gay men and lesbians, including a gay MP, an openly gay Army trainer, a drag queen, a transvestite, a young Arab-Israeli journalist, and same-sex parents raising their children and a number of artists and activists.

Screenings
The film premiered at the Los Angeles Cinema Festival of Hollywood on January 13, 2013, and has shown in various LGBT and general film festivals including at Out In The Desert 2013 (Tucson, Arizona), Atlanta Jewish Film Festival (Atlanta, Georgia), Queergestreift Film Festival (Konstanz, Germany), the Polish LGBT Film Festival (Warsaw, Poland), Philadelphia QFest (Philadelphia, Pennsylvania). It premiered in Israel on June 26, 2013, during the Tel Aviv LGBT International Film Festival.

Cast
Appearances in alphabetical order:
Hader Rayan Abu-Seif		
Yoav Arad		
Yossi Berg		
Eliad Cohen		
Eytan Fox		
Yehonathan Gatro		
Mickey Gitzen		
Nitzan Horowitz		
Amit Alexander Lev		
Alon Levi		
Ivri Lider		
Andrey Nozdrin		
Itai Pinkas		
Rafi Vazana

References

External links
Official website
IMDb.com page

Israeli LGBT-related films
Israeli documentary films
Documentary films about gay men
Documentary films about LGBT and Judaism
Films set in Tel Aviv
2012 films
2012 documentary films
Films directed by Michael Lucas
LGBT culture in Tel Aviv